The term Sayyid brothers refers to  Abdullah Khan  and Syed Husain Ali Khan, who were two powerful nobles in the Mughal Empire during the early 18th century.

They were Indian Muslims who claimed to belong to the family of Sayyids or the descendants of the Islamic prophet Muhammad through his daughter Fatima and son-in-law and cousin Ali who belonged to the Banu Hashim Clan of the Quraish Tribe. Their claim is generally not accepted, they were said to be descendants of families who migrated from Punjab to eastern part of the Muzaffarnagar district. 

The Sayyid Brothers became highly influential in the Mughal Court after Aurangzeb's death and became de facto sovereigns of the empire when they began to make and unmake emperors during the anarchy following the death of emperor Aurangzeb in 1707.

The Syed brothers restored Mughal authority to Ajmer in Rajasthan with the surrender of Maharaja Ajit Singh, and the Jat leader Churaman, too, accepted Mughal authority in a negotiated peace with the Syed brothers. During their rule, the Sikh rebel Banda Singh Bahadur was also captured and executed. The Sayyids engaged in recruitment of soldiers very few who were not Sayyids, or inhabitants of Barha, or were non-Muslims.

Bahadur Shah I died in 1712, and his successor Jahandar Shah was assassinated on the orders of the Sayyid Brothers.In 1713, Jahandar's nephew Farrukhsiyar (r. 1713–1719) became the emperor with the brothers' help. His reign marked the ascendancy of the brothers, who monopolised state power and reduced the Emperor to a figurehead. The brothers conspired to send Nizam-ul-Mulk to Deccan, away from the Mughal Court, to reduce his influence. In 1719, the Brothers blinded, deposed and murdered Farrukhsiyar. They then arranged for his first cousin, Rafi ud-Darajat, to be the next ruler in February 1719. When Rafi ud-Darajat died of lung disease in June, they made his elder brother, Rafi ud-Daulah (Shah Jahan II), ruler. After Rafi ud-Daulah also died of lung disease in September 1719, Muhammad Shah (r. 1719–1748) ascended the throne at the age of seventeen with the Sayyid Brothers as his regents until 1720. 

Muhammad Shah, to take back control of his rule, arranged for the brothers to be killed with the help of Nizam-ul-Mulk Asaf Jah. Syed Hussain Ali Khan was murdered at Fatehpur Sikri in 1720, and Syed Hassan Ali Khan Barha was fatally poisoned in 1722.

Early appointments of the Syed Brothers in the Mughal Empire 
 

Syed Hassan Ali Khan and Syed Hussain Ali Khan were two of the numerous sons of Syed Abdullah Khan - Sayyid Mian. The two Syed brothers, who now come into such prominence, were not mere upstarts, but came from the old military aristocracy. Besides the prestige of Syed lineage and the personal renown acquired by their own valor, they were the sons of Syed Mian who was chosen by Aurangzeb as the first Subedar of Bijapur in the Deccan and then Subedar of Ajmer. Their father, Syed Abdullah Khan titled Syed Miyan, had risen in the service of Ruhullah Khan, Aurangzeb's Mir Bakhshi, and finally, on receiving the rank of an imperial Mansabdar, attached himself to the eldest Prince Muazzam.

During the reign of the Mughal Emperor Aurangzeb in 1697, Syed Hassan Ali Khan was Faujdar of Sultanpur, Nazarbar in Baglana, and was appointed Subahdar of Khandesh in 1698 with an objective of halting Maratha expansion in the region. Later he was appointed ruler of Hoshangabad, Khandesh, and Nazarbar coupled with Thalner in the Sarkar of the same province. Subsequently, he was responsible for Aurangabad during the final campaign of the Mughal Emperor against the Maratha in 1705 and attended the funeral of Aurangzeb in 1707.

Hassan's younger brother, Hussain Ali Khan, who is admitted by every one to have been a man of much greater energy and resolution than his elder brother, had in the Mughal Emperor Aurangzeb reign held charge first of Ranthambore, in Ajmer, and then of Hindaun-Bayana, in Agra.

Role in the Mughal war of succession (1707–1709)

After Prince  Mu'izz ud-Din Jahandar Shah, the eldest of  Emperor Bahadur Shah's sons, had been appointed in 1106 H. (1694–5) to the charge of the Multan province, Syed Hassan Ali Khan and his brother followed him there. In an expedition against a refractory Baloch zamindar, the Sayyids were of opinion that the honours of the day were theirs. Prince Mu'izz ud-Din Jahandar Shah thought otherwise, and assigned them to his then favourite administrator Isa Khan Main, the Punjabi Muslim of the Main tribe. The Sayyids quit the service in dudgeon and repaired to Lahore, where they lived in comparative poverty, waiting for employment from Munim Khan II, the Nazim of that place. Munim Khan II belonged to the party of the Indian Shaikhzadas. When Emperor Aurangzeb died and Prince Muhammad Mu'azzam Shah Alam, reached Lahore on his march to Agra to contest the throne, the Sayyids presented themselves, and their services were gladly accepted. In the Battle of Jajau or Jajowan on the 18th Rabi I, 1119 H. (18 June 1707), they served in the vanguard and fought valiantly on foot, as was the Sayyid habit in an emergency. A third brother, Syed Nur ud-Din Ali Khan, was left dead on the field, and Syed Hussain Ali Khan was severely wounded. Though their rank was raised to 4000, and the elder brother received his father's title of Syed Mian, they were not treated with such favour as their exceptional services seemed to deserve, either by the new Emperor or his vizier.

The two Sayyids managed to quarrel with Khanazad Khan, the vizier Munim Khan's second son, and though the breach was healed by a visit to them from the vizier in person, there is little doubt that this difference helped to keep them out of employment. Syed Hussain Ali Khan is also said to have offended Prince Mu'izz ud-Din Jahandar Shah. The morning after the battle of Jajau, the Prince visited their quarters to condole with them on the death of their brother, Syed Nur ud-Din Ali Khan, and in so doing launched out into praises of their valour. Syed Hussain Ali Khan met these overtures in an aggressive manner, saying that what they had done was nothing, many had done as much, their valour would be known when their lord was deserted and alone, and the strength of their right arm had seated him on the throne. Prince Mu'izz ud-Din Jahandar Shah was vexed by this speech, and refrained from making any recommendation to his father in their favour. Nay, he did his best to prevent their obtaining lucrative employment, and we read of their being obliged to rely upon the Emperor's bounty for their travelling expenses, which were necessarily great, as they were kept in attendance on the Court while it was constantly on the march. However, Syed Shujaat Khan Barha held the province of Ajmer.

On 11th Muharram 1120 H., 1 April 1708, Prince Azim-ush-shan nominated the younger brother Syed Hussain Ali Khan, to represent him as the governor of Bihar, of which the capital was at Azimabad. In Shaban 1120 H. (Oct. 1708) Syed Hassan Ali Khan had been named to the subah of Ajmer, then in a disturbed state owing to the Rajput rising, a condition of things with which Syed Shuja'at Ali Khan Barha seemed hardly capable of dealing. Syed Hassan Ali Khan had barely more than reached Delhi, to raise new troops and make other preparations, when the Emperor, Bahadur Shah, changed his mind and Shuja'at Ali Khan Barha was received again into favour and maintained in his Government. Sayyid Saeed Khan Barha was placed in charge of the Kachawa capital at Amber. At length, by the favour of Prince Azim-ush-shan, Syed Hassan Ali Khan on the 21st Dhu al-Qida 1122 H. (10 January 1711) became that Prince's deputy in the province of Allahabad. Khan-i Jahan Barha was made the faujdar of Moradabad.

Prince Farrukhsiyar's request to the Sayyids 

When Prince Farrukhsiyar first arrived at Azimabad, Syed Hussain Ali Khan was away on an expedition, apparently the recapture of Rohtas fort of Bihar, which about this time had been seized by Muhammad Raza ''Rayat Khan''. The Sayyids had felt annoyed on hearing that Farrukhsiyar had issued coin and caused the khutba to be read in his father, Prince Azim-ush-shan's, name, without waiting to learn the result of the impending struggle at Lahore. Thus on his return to his headquarters his first impulse was to decline altogether that Prince's overtures. In truth, no attempt could well look more hopeless than that upon which Prince Farrukhsiyar wished to enter. The Prince's mother now hazarded a private visit to the Sayyids mother, taking with her little granddaughter. Her arguments rested on the fact that the Sayyids position was due to the kindness of the Prince's father. That father, two brothers, and two uncles had been killed, and the Prince's own means were insufficient for any enterprise. Let Syed Hussain Ali Khan then choose his own course, either let him aid Prince Farrukhsiyar to recover his rights and revenge his father's death, or else let him place the Prince in chains and send him a prisoner to Emperor Jahandar Shah. Here the Prince's mother and daughter bared their heads and wept aloud. Overcome by their tears, the Sayyida called her son within the harem. The little girl fell bareheaded at his feet and implored his aid. His mother told him that "whatever was the result he would be a gainer: if defeated, his name would stand recorded as a hero till Judgment Day; if successful, the whole of Hindustan would be at their feet and above them none but the Emperor”. Finally she exclaimed, “If you adhere to Emperor Jahandar Shah, you will have to answer before the Great Judge for disavowing your mother's claim upon you.”

At these words Syed Hussain Ali Khan took up the women's veils and replaced them on their heads swearing a binding oath that he would espouse the Prince's cause. The next night Prince Farrukhsiyar presented himself at the Khan's house, saying that he had come either to be seized and sent to Emperor Jahandar Shah or to enter into an agreement for the recovery of the throne. The Sayyid bound himself finally to fight on Prince Farrukhsiyar's behalf. He wrote at once to his elder brother, Syed Hassan Ali Khan Barha, at Allahabad, inviting him to join the same side, and Prince Farrukhsiyar addressed a farman to him making many promises, and authorising him to expend the Bengal treasure, then at Allahabad, on the enlistment of troops. It is quite clear that at this time, or soon afterwards, the two chief places in the Empire, those of Vizier and of Amir ul Umara were formally promised to the two brothers as their reward in case of success. Syed Hassan Ali Khan Barha, on being superseded at Allahabad, gives in his adhesion to Prince Farrukhsiyar.

Mughal Succession crises of 1712 
At first Syed Hassan Ali Khan Barha's intention was to submit to Emperor Jahandar Shah, the de facto Emperor, to whom he sent letters professing his loyalty and offering his services. Three months before the death of Emperor Bahadur Shah, he had gone out towards Jaunpur to restore order. In this he was not successful and the pay of his soldiers fell into arrears. The men raised a disturbance, and Syed Hassan Ali Khan Barha's only anxiety was to escape from them and take shelter within the fort of Allahabad. He promised publicly that as soon as he reached the city, all the collections then in the hands of his agents should be made over to the troops. On the return march, word came of Emperor Bahadur Shah's death. While Syed Hassan Ali Khan Barha was still in expectation of a favourable reply to his letter to Emperor Jahandar Shah, he was surprised to learn that his Government had been taken from him, and that the deputy of the new governor was on his way to take possession. The province had been granted to a Gardezi Sadaat of Manikpur, subah Allahabad, one Raji Muhammad Khan, who had risen to notice in the recent righting at Lahore, and through the reputation thereby acquired, had been appointed Mir Atish or general of artillery. The new governor nominated as his deputy his relation, one Syed Abdul Ghafoorr (a descendant of Syed Sadar Jahan, Sadar-us-Sadur, Pihanwi).

Syed Abdul Ghafoor obtained contingents from one or two zamindars and collected altogether 6,000 to 7,000 men. When he drew near to Karra Manikpur, Syed Abul Hasan Khan, a Sayyid of Bijapur, who was Syed Hassan Ali Khan Barha's Bakhshi, advanced at the head of 3,000 men to bar his progress. At the Battle of Sarai Alam Chand on 2 August 1712 with Abul Hasan Khan's victory for Syed Hassan Ali Khan Barha it became clear now that the Sayyids were allied against the Emperor for the new contender Prince Farrukhsiyar.

Prince Farrukhsiyar, meanwhile, had marched out with an army along with Syed Hussain Ali Khan Barha from Patna to Allahabad to join Syed Hassan Ali Khan Barha as soon as possible. Emperor Jahandar Shah learning of the defeat of his General Syed Abdul Ghafoor sent his own son Prince Azzu-ud-Din along with Generals Lutfullah Khan and Khwaja Hussain Khan Dauran to face this army. The Second Battle of Khajwah was fought in Fatehpur District, Uttar Pradesh on 28 November 1712. Prince Farrukhsiyar decisively defeated Prince Azzu-ud-Din, and the General Lutfullah Khan of Panipat, Sayyid Muzaffar Khan Barha, the maternal uncle of Abdullah Khan, Sayyid Hassan Khan, the son of Hussain Ali Khan, and Sayyid Mustafa Khan, who were on the opposite side, joined the faction of Farrukhsiyar. This forced the Emperor Jahandar Shah and his Vizier the Great Zulfiqar Khan Nusrat Jung to take the field. At the Battle of Agra fought on 10 January 1713, Prince Farrukhsiyar won decisively and became the Emperor of the Mughal Empire succeeding his uncle Jahandar Shah. Farrukhsiyar's revolt against Jahandar Shah was a risky pusuit, and his victory was entirely due to the resources and daring of the two Sayyid brothers, something which the Sayyid brothers were well-aware of, and contributed to their arrogant policy towards their emperor, whom they saw as their own creature.

Rise of the Sayyid brothers 
After his victory at the Battle of Agra in 1713, Emperor Farrukhsiyar on the way from Agra to Delhi, and after arrival at Delhi, conferred many new appointments and new titles on his generals and noblemen. Syed Hassan Ali Khan Barha was awarded titles Nawab Qutb-ul-mulk, Yamin-ud-daulah, Syed Mian Saani, Bahadur Zafar Jung, Sipah-salar, Yar-i-wafadar and became Vizier or Prime Minister. Syed Hussain Ali Khan was appointed first Bakhshi with the titles of Umdat-ul-mulk, Amir-ul-Umara, Bahadur, Feroze Jung, Sipah Sardar.

The Amir-ul-Umara, Hussain Ali Khan, was inclined to use of exaggerated and insolent language. Flatterers in the train of Hussain Ali Khan used to recite the verses, in the Emperor's presence: 

"The whole world and all creation seeks the shelter of your umbrella, 
Kings of the world earn crowns through your emprize."

Rajputana Campaign 1714 
The Rajput States had been in veiled revolt from the imperial authority for 50 years. Ajit Singh had taken advantage of the Mughal civil war to expel the Mughal commander from Marwar. Emperor Bahadur Shah had been unable, owing to more pressing affairs, to reduce the Raja's effectually. Ajit Singh, after forbidding slaughtering cows by Muslims for food and the call for prayer from the Alamgiri Mosque, besides ejecting the imperial officers from Jodhpur and destroying their houses, had entered the imperial territory and taken possession of Ajmer. The Rana of Udaipur and Jai Singh were acting in close cooperation with him, and the latter had defeated Hussain Khan Barha of Mewat in the Battle of Sambhar. Early in Emperor Farrukhsiyar's reign it was determined that this encroachment must be put an end to; it was necessary to march against him. 

Syed Hussain Ali Khan left Delhi on 6 January 1714. Raja Ajit Singh, "upon learning of the march of this army, was alarmed at its strength and at the prowess of the Sayyids." In the country around Ajmer , Hussain Khan burnt the villages belonging to Marwar, while those belonging to Amber State were left unharmed. The country was thus settled and brought under Imperial rule step by step.  Hussain Khan overran Jodhpur and compelled the rebel Ajit Singh to flee and take refuge in the hills. After a brief campaign Raghunath, a munshi in the service of Maharaja Ajit Singh of Jodhpur came to negotiate peace.  Syed Hussain Ali Khan thus advanced to Mairtha, where he halted until the terms of peace had been arranged. The terms were that the Raja should give one of his daughters in marriage to the Emperor, in the mode which they styled Dola that the Raja's son, Abhay Singh, should accompany Hussain Ali Khan to Court, and that the Raja in person should attend when summoned. Zafar Khan Roshan ud-Daulah arrived at Court on the 5th Jamadi I, 1126 H. (18 May 1714), with the news.

Rebellion of Churaman Jat 
On the advice of the Syed brothers, the emperor Farrukhsiyar had sent Jai Singh, who had taken part in his father's campaigns against the Jats as a boy, in an expedition against Churaman Jat, resulting in a siege that lasted 12 months. The Sayyids appointed their maternal uncle Sayyid Khan-i-Jahan Barha to the command of a second army, and Jai Singh, in disgust, returned to court, full of hatred towards the Sayyids who had spoiled his laurels. At length Churaman made overtures to the Wazir Qutb-ul-Mulk, offering tribute and surrendered his fortresses. Churaman Jat became a new favorite of the Sayyids, and he helped the Sayyids in their every excursion till his death.

Court factions 
The Mughals were originally of Turco-Mongol origin, and followed Indian culture with Central Asian influences.   The influence of Indian culture was extremely pronounced, as the Mughals successively married into the Hindu Rajput dynasties of the Indian subcontinent and became Indianised, and all the Mughal emperors after and including Akbar had high-caste Hindu Rajput wives, and in most cases, mothers, including Jahangir and Shah Jahan. There were also significant numbers of Turkish and Irani present at the Mughal court, and many of the Mughal princesses and wives that were a part of the large Mughal royal harem were of Persian or Turkish descent. 

As the emperor Farrukhsiyar was unable to overthrow the Sayyid brothers by himself, he raised the Emperor's party with the aim to overthrow the Sayyids. For this task he chose Khan-i Dauran(an Indian Muslim of Agra), Mir Jumla the Mughal, Shaista Khan(Inayatullah Kashmiri, an old Alamgiri noble), and later, Itiqad Khan(Muhammad Murad Kashmiri), the last whom he chose as the future Wazir. Itiqad Khan was related by marriage to Farrukhsiyar's mother, who was also of Kashmiri descent. 

There were other blocs of power such as the Irani faction, which was a party tied by marriage and personal ambitions. It is called Irani as its leader, Zulfiqar Khan, was a Shi'a Persian noble born in India, and it relied on Indian power-holders of various origin. It had influence through Zulfiqar Khan during the year-long reign of Jahandar Shah, and found opposition in Kolkatash Khan. With the overthrow of Jahandar Shah, and the execution of Zulfiqar Khan by the Syed Brothers, an Indo-Muslim party came into ascendance under the Sayyid faction. The Sayyid party which ruled during the reign of Farrukhsiyar was a powerful family group that was linked together by ties of blood and marriage. The Sayyid party was distinct from other factions as the Sayyids leaders recruited very few who were neither Sayyids, residents of Barha, nor Muslim. As the bulk of their troops were their own Sayyid clanmen, the Sayyids had greater strength and cohesion than other factions in the Mughal court. The Sayyids had developed a sort of common brotherhood among themselves and took up the cause of every individual as an insult to the whole group and an infringement to the rights of Sayyids in general. They were strongly united around their leaders, Qutb-ul-Mulk and Amir-ul-Umara Hussain Ali Khan. The unique privilege of the Sayyids of leading the imperial vanguard also gave them an advantage over other parts of the Mughal military and exalted their sense of social pride. The Sayyid party continuously tried to counter-act the Emperor Farrukhsiyar's plots to attain self-rule. Another bloc, the Turanis, also formed an opposition to  Sayyid rule. The Turanis were not in a position to sufficiently act as a power pressure group against the Sayyids, or to bargain from a position of strength, and Farrukhsiyar did not trust the group as he suspected they would attempt to weaken him. There was a continual struggle for control of power and authority between the Indian Muslim, Irani and Turani blocs at court, and each attempted to win the favour of the Emperor in order to counter the other factions.

Farrukhsiyar's Struggles with the Sayyids 

The Sayyids, as was natural, looked on Farrukhsiyar's accession to the throne as the work of their hands, and resented the grant of any share of power to other persons. On the other hand, the small group of Farrukhsiyar's intimates, men who had known him from his childhood and stood on the most familiar terms with him, such as Khan-i Dauran, were aggrieved at their exclusion from a share in the spoil, but did not believe they were strong enough to counter the Sayyids openly. Their plan, therefore was to work upon the weak-minded Farrukhsiyar by telling him:

"The Sayyids look upon you as their creation, and think nothing of you or your power. They hold the two chief civil and military officers, their relations and friends have the principal other offices, and the most profitable land assignments(jagirs). Their power will go on increasing, until should they enter on treasonable projects, there will be no one to resist them."

Neither Farrukhsiyar nor his favorites dared to attack them openly, and Farrukhsiyar was obliged to submit to the Sayyid brothers, but nevertheless, continued his intrigues. Farrukhsiyar had improbably obtained the throne largely due to the martial kills of the Sayyid Brothers, who led the Sayyid clan long settled in Barha, which for generations had provided famously brave contingents to imperial armies. Even as Emperor, he lacked revenues to fund his own forces, as he could not confront the Syed Brothers. Further, the Syed Brothers threatened to enthrone another imperial family member whenever Farrukhsiyar proved too demanding. Farrukhsiyar was forced to turn to other nobles, who were to be raised on an equal position to them. If the Sayyid Brothers had submitted to the raising of other nobles, then all would be well, but should they, with the rashness(jahalat) for which the Barha Sayyids were famous, resist the undermining of power, then it would be necessary to use force to confront them, although it was considered to be a last measure. During the Mir Bakhshi's absence during the Rajputana campaign, Farrukhsiyar started raising funds to raise troops for Khwaja Asim Khan-i Dauran and Ubaidullah Mir Jumla II in opposition to the Syed brothers. Khan-i Dauran was put at the head of 5000 Wala-Shahis, while Mir Jumla was given 5000 Mughal troops, recruited by his adopted son, Amanat Khan.

Being a man of the sword and a soldier, Hassan Ali Khan had no natural taste for civil and financial administration, and found no opportunity in acquiring such experience. The Sayyids of Barha historically had served military roles rather than as Diwans. This Wazir was endowed with virtues of courage and generosity, but lacked the zeal for public service and desisted the drudgery of office work. Ratan Chand, a Hindu Baniya of Jansath near the Sayyids home was appointed instead by Abdullah to his clerical work and trusted him with the financial affairs of the state that was meant for the Wazir. He had been recently created a Raja with the rank of 2,000 zat in 1712 by Farrukhsiyar, and came to be regarded as a very effective administrator. He was even entrusted with appointment of kazis. Taking advantage of this, Mir Jumla began independently bringing forward candidates to the Emperor, instead of following usual routine where it was the work of the Wazir. As the Wazir suffered in influence, the Sayyids felt aggrieved, and Abdullah Khan now wrote letters to his brother to return to Delhi with all possible speed from his campaign in Rajputana. The Mir Bakhshi reached the capital in 16 July 1714.

Mir Jumla and Khan Dauran talked well, but evaded dealing with the kernel of the matter. Mir Jumla, having no real strength of character, knew that he was not fitted to enter the lists as a champion to fight the Sayyids. He therefore made excuses and drew to one side. Khan Dauran was in reality a mere braggadocio, a big talker; and he was frightened that if he should ever be called on to take the lead, he may lose his life in the attempt to destroy the Sayyids. 

As for the Emperor, his own troops and those of his relations were unequal to an attack on the Sayyids. The imperial and Wala-shahi troops comprised many low-caste men and mere artisans held commands. The Emperor had no proof of their fighting quality. The unity and the firm resolve of the Syed Brothers being ascertained, it was decided once more to resume friendly relations with the Sayyid brothers. In December 1714, the Syed Brothers assembled their troops and possessed themselves of the gates of the citadel containing the Emperor's palace, proposing terms of reconciliation. 

The Sayyid Brothers' terms were that they would not reconciliate unless Mir Jumla and Khan-i Dauran were dismissed. Islam Khan V, Sayyid Hussain Khan Barha, Sayyid Shujaat Khan Barha and Khwaja Jafar would negotiate a settlement whereby Mir Jumla was forced out of office in Delhi and sent to Bihar on 16 December 1714.. However, Khan-i Dauran was spared due to the intercession of his brother Khwaja Jafar, who was a holy man, who swore that Khan-i Dauran would never act against the Sayyid Brothers. Lutfullah Khan Sadiq, Farrukhsiyar's closest advisor, who the Sayyid Brothers believed to be the root of all mischief, was deprived of his rank, and his mansions and gardens were confiscated. Successive agents chosen by Farrukhsiyar gave up the attempt and went over to the Sayyids as more capable as protecting their own interests. 

Hussain Ali Khan entered the palace with his men, observing the same precautions as in the case of Syed Hassan Ali Khan Barha. The Emperor and the Mir Bakhshi exchanged compliments, under which their real sentiments were easily perceived. Some months before this time Hussain Ali Khan had obtained in his own favour a grant of the Deccan provinces, but he had meant to exercise the government through a deputy, Daud Khan Panni. Now it was proposed that Hussain Ali Khan would leave court and take over charge of the Deccan himself. Khan-i Dauran was appointed as the deputy of Hussain Ali Khan in his duties as Mir Bakhshi.

Deccan Campaigns
Sayyid Hussain Ali Khan was appointed the Viceroy of the Deccan. In an unprecedented measure, he was given a grand seal which gave him full authority to assign jagirs in the Deccan, appoint and dismiss officers and commandants of the great fortresses, which were previously jealously guarded by the Mughal royals in order to serve as a counterweight against overly ambitious provincials. 

He rejected his predecessor Daud Khan Panni's agreements of tribute to the Marathas. Farrukhsiyar sent Daud Khan Panni, the newly appointed governor of Burhanpur, a secret message to attack and kill Hussain Khan, if possible. Daud Khan Panni attempted to gain the backing of the Marathas in order to attack Hussain Khan, while the Nizam left in disgust. However, at the Battle of Burhanpur, Daud Khan was easily defeated and killed by Hussain Khan, who captured Farrukhsiyar's letters to the rebel at his camp. The Marathas had remained inactive during the battle. 

Hussain Khan was eager to establish his firm hold over the Deccan. He threw all precaution to the winds, and declared hostility to all the Marathas without discrimination, coming into head-on collision with the Maratha chieftains. As a result, Maratha raiding and indecisive open warfare continued. In 1717, his general Zulfiqar Beg, who was sent with four thousand horse and two thousand infantry to punish Khandoji Dabhade, was defeated and killed. In order to avenge his death, Hussain Ali Khan sent Muhakkam Singh, the son of Churaman Jat (who was loyal to the Barha Sayyids), and his brother Saif-ud-Din Khan Barha, to punish the Marathas. Dahbade and his Marathas, who were plundering Khandesh, were signally defeated at a battle near Ahmadnagar. The army dispersed and fled, after which Hussain Khan ravaged the Maratha territory up to the suburbs of Satara. In these campaigns Hussain Khan was assisted by the Maratha chiefs Chandrasen Jadhav and Nemaji Sindhia.

In 1717, in fear that the Sayyid brothers would replace him, Farrukhsiyar blinded three princes who had the potential to be raised to the throne, including his younger brother.

Rebellion of Prince Nikusiyar
The rivals of the Syed Brothers proclaimed Nikusiyar, another puppet-king, as the emperor of India at Agra. Abdullah Khan favoured settlement with Nikusiyar, while Hussain Khan insisted on a fight with him. His view prevailed, and the Syed Brothers defeated Nikusiyar and his allies. Hussain Khan besieged Agra in June, and Nikusiyar surrendered in August. Nikusiyar was sent to prison where he died. His supporter, Mitrasen, committed suicide.

End of the Sayyid brothers
Contemporary evidence suggests that public opinion did not approve of Farrukhsiyar, but turned against the Sayyid Brothers after his execution. The way in which the royal members of the royal family provoked an outburst of anger. Additionally, the Sayyid brothers becoming the sole authority of Mughal politics excited the jealousy of other nobles, including the Iranis and Turanis, whose status had been reduced. As a result, they formed a force of counter-revolution against the Sayyid brothers.

The leader of the Counter Revolution was Nizam-ul-Mulk. To subdue the counter-revolution, the Sayyid brothers shifted Nizam-ul-mulk from Delhi. Nizam was appointed as the Subahdar of Malwa. In due course Nizam captured the forts of Asirgarh and Burhanpur in Deccan. Moreover, Nizam also killed Mir Alam Ali Khan, the adopted son of Syed Hussain Ali Khan, who was the Deputy Subahdar of the Deccan.

Meanwhile, in Delhi, a plot was devised against the Sayyid brothers. Syed Hussain Ali Khan was ultimately killed by an assassin, Haider Beg Dughlat on 9 October 1720. Syed Hassan Ali Khan Barha with a big army set out to avenge his brother's murder. However, Syed Hassan Ali Khan Barha was defeated at Hasanpur near Palwal (Haryana) in 15–16 November in the same year and imprisoned. Thus, the protracted career of the Sayyid brothers came to an end.

Aftermath
Sayyid Abdullah Khan remained a prisoner in the citadel of Delhi, under the charge of Haider Quli Khan, for another two years. He was "treated with respect, receiving delicate food to eat and fine clothes to wear". But so long as he survived, the Mughals remained uneasy, not knowing what sudden change of fortune might happen. Thus the nobles never ceased their efforts in alarming Muhammad Shah.

At the Battle of Hasanpur many Barha Sayyids had maintained their entrenchments and continued the fight for an hour even after the capture of Qutb-ul-Mulk. When at length they were satisfied that the day was lost, the Sayyids began to cross the Jamna back to the Sayyid country at Jansath. Allahyar Khan left for Delhi, and Saifuddin Khan left the prince Muhammad Ibrahim at the orchard of Qutbuddin Khan, close to the village of Nekpur. Saifuddin Khan left for Jansath and sent Baqir Ali Khan and Khizr Khan to Delhi who carried off the Sayyid women and children back to the Sayyid country. In the confusion, one of the daughters of Syed Najmuddin Ali Khan, one of the brothers of Qutb-ul-Mulk, had taken refuge in the house of a mirasin or singer attached to the sayyids, and was discovered by the adherents of the emperor Muhammad Shah. She was placed in the care of his mother, Nawab Qudsiya, who proposed to marry the girl to Muhammad Shah. Complaining that such a thing had never happened to a Barha Sayyid, Qutb-ul-Mulk did not agree to the proposal. Thereafter Muhammad Shah dropped this idea.

In order to reduce the power of the Turani nobles, Muhammad Shah thought of using the services of Qutb-ul-Mulk after setting him free and raising him to a high mansab. He sent a message to Qutb-ul-Mulk in this regard and received an encouraging reply from him. However, on hearing of this overture made by Muhammad Shah to Qutb-ul-Mulk and fearing the dire implications thereof, Qutb-ul-Mulk's opponents had him poisoned to death on 12 October 1722. Instead in 1723 Muhammad Shah released Sayyid Najmuddin Ali Khan Barha from prison to defeat Hamid Khan and Nizam-ul-Mulk in their separatist policy in Gujarat, and as a result Najmuddin Ali Khan Barha was given the governorship of Ajmer after the defeat of Hamid Khan.

Also known as
There are several different spellings and terms for the Sayyid Brothers:

 Syed brothers
 Saiyads of Barha
 Saiyid Brothers
 Saadat e Bara
 Sayyids of Barha
 Sayeeds of Barha
 Sayeed brothers

See also
 Saadat-e-Bara, a community of Sayyids, which had considerable influence during the reign of the Mughal Empire.
 Saadat Khan He played a major role in the overthrow of the Sayyid Brothers.
 Sadaat-e-Bilgram
 Sayyid dynasty This pre-Mughal dynasty may have been connected to the Sayyid brothers. See also Khizr Khan, the founder of this dynasty.

References

External links

 Mughal dynasty genealogy

1666 births
1668 births
1720 deaths
1722 deaths
Assassinated military personnel
Assassinated nobility
Indian Muslims
Mughal generals
People from Muzaffarnagar
Regents of India
Sibling duos
1720 murders in Asia
1722 murders in Asia